The 1990 FIBA Africa Championship for Women was the 11th FIBA Africa Championship for Women, played under the rules of FIBA, the world governing body for basketball, and the FIBA Africa thereof. The tournament was hosted by Tunisia from March 17 to 24, 1990.

Senegal defeated Zaire 70–68 in the final to win their sixth title with both winner and runner-up qualifying for the 1990 FIBA Women's World Cup.

Draw

Preliminary round

Group A

Group B

Knockout stage

Semifinals

7th place match

5th place match

Bronze medal match

Final

Final standings

Awards

External links
Official Website

References

1990 FIBA Africa Championship for Women
1990 FIBA Africa Championship for Women
AfroBasket Women
International basketball competitions hosted by Tunisia
March 1990 sports events in Africa